Bohodukhiv (- Bogodukhov) is a city in Kharkiv Oblast (province) of eastern Ukraine. It is the administrative centre of Bohodukhiv Raion (district). Bohodukhiv hosts the administration of Bohodukhiv urban hromada, one of the hromadas of Ukraine. Current population: .

History
This settlement was founded in 1662 as a small sloboda and Bogodukhov ostrog. It has been a town since 1681. In 1709, at the time of the Russo-Swedish War, it was taken by Menshikov and the emperor Alexius. After April 1780 it was the administrative centre of Bogodukhov uyezd in Kharkov Governorate of the Russian Empire.

A cathedral was built in 1793.

The population was 10,522 in 1860 and 11,928 in 1897. In Soviet times, much was done to develop industry and education here.

A local newspaper has been published here since February 1930.

During World War II, Bogodukhov was occupied by the German Army from 16 October 1941 to 17 February 1943 and again from 11 March to 7 August 1943. It was liberated by 1st Tank Army.

In 1944, a dairy factory was built here In 1950 the city had three secondary schools, five seven-year schools, two primary schools and a vocational school. In 1965, a medical college was opened here.

In January 1989 the population was 18,962 people and the main branch of the economy was the food industry. In January 2013 the population was 15 797 people.

Climate

Transport 

Twin towns – sister cities

Bohodukhiv is twinned with:
 Boyertown, United States

References

External links
 Official page - Association of Ukrainian Cities
  Unofficial site

Cities in Kharkiv Oblast
Bogodukhovsky Uyezd
Cities of district significance in Ukraine
Cities and towns built in the Sloboda Ukraine
Bohodukhiv Raion
Populated places established in 1662